Antonio Marcellini (January 17, 1937 – May 22, 2010) was an Italian professional football player.

Born in Rome, he played for 4 seasons (29 games, no goals) in the Serie A for A.S. Roma and U.S. Alessandria Calcio 1912.

References

1937 births
2010 deaths
Italian footballers
Serie A players
Serie B players
A.S. Roma players
U.S. Alessandria Calcio 1912 players
Catania S.S.D. players
A.C.N. Siena 1904 players
Trapani Calcio players
Association football midfielders